Epsilon Leporis, Latinized from ε Leporis, is a third-magnitude star in the southern constellation Lepus. The apparent visual magnitude of +3.166 places it third in brightness among the stars in this constellation.

This is an evolved giant star with a stellar classification of K4 III that has expanded to 40 times the Sun's radius. It is about 1.72 billion years old and has 1.70 times the mass of the Sun, with a luminosity 372 times as great. The outer atmosphere is cooler than the Sun's with an effective temperature of 4,131 K, giving it the orange hue of a K-type star. In terms of its composition, this star shows a similar abundance of elements other than hydrogen and helium to the Sun.

The envelope of this star is undergoing oscillations that show up as changes in the star's radial velocity. Over long durations these follow a linear trend, in combination with shorter period oscillations occurring over a few days. These oscillations are unlikely to be the result of rotational module as that would imply a high rotation rate, which would display itself through strong X-ray emissions. Instead, they may be the result of solar-like and Mira-like oscillations.

References 

K-type giants
Lepus (constellation)
Leporis, Epsilon
Durchmusterung objects
Leporis, 02
032887
023685
1654